The Canticle of the Sun, also known as Laudes Creaturarum (Praise of the Creatures) and Canticle of the Creatures, is a religious song composed by Saint Francis of Assisi. It was written in an Umbrian dialect of Italian but has since been translated into many languages. It is believed to be among the first works of literature, if not the first, written in the Italian language.

The Canticle of the Sun in its praise of God thanks Him for such creations as "Brother Fire" and "Sister Water". It is an affirmation of Francis' personal theology as he often referred to animals as brothers and sisters to Mankind, rejected material accumulation and sensual comforts in favor of "Lady Poverty".

Saint Francis is said to have composed most of the canticle in late 1224 while recovering from an illness at San Damiano, in a small cottage that had been built for him by Saint Clare and other women of her Order of Poor Ladies. According to tradition, the first time it was sung in its entirety was by Francis and Brothers Angelo and Leo, two of his original companions, on Francis' deathbed, the final verse praising "Sister Death" having been added only a few minutes before.

A legend which emphasizes the topos of "brightness" says he did not physically write the Canticle, because of his blindness from an eye disease; but he dictated it and he did it looking at Nature through the eye of mind. Father Eric Doyle wrote: "Though physically blind, he was able to see more clearly than ever with the inner eye of his mind. With unparalleled clarity he perceived the basic unity of all creation and his own place as a friar in the midst of God's creatures. His unqualified love of all creatures, great and small, had grown into unity in his own heart. He was so open to reality that it found a place to be at home in his heart and he was at home everywhere and anywhere. He was a centre of communion with all creatures".

The Canticle of the Sun is first mentioned in the Vita Prima of Thomas of Celano in 1228.

Text and translation

Original text in Umbrian dialect:
Altissimu, omnipotente bon Signore,
Tue so le laude, la gloria e l'honore et onne benedictione.

Ad Te solo, Altissimo, se konfano,
et nullu homo ène dignu te mentouare.

Laudato sie, mi Signore cum tucte le Tue creature,
spetialmente messor lo frate Sole,
lo qual è iorno, et allumini noi per lui.
Et ellu è bellu e radiante cum grande splendore:
de Te, Altissimo, porta significatione.

Laudato si, mi Signore, per sora Luna e le stelle:
in celu l'ài formate clarite et pretiose et belle.

Laudato si, mi Signore, per frate Uento
et per aere et nubilo et sereno et onne tempo,
per lo quale, a le Tue creature dài sustentamento.

Laudato si, mi Signore, per sor'Acqua,
la quale è multo utile et humile et pretiosa et casta.

Laudato si, mi Signore, per frate Focu,
per lo quale ennallumini la nocte:
ed ello è bello et iucundo et robustoso et forte.

Laudato si, mi Signore, per sora nostra matre Terra,
la quale ne sustenta et gouerna,
et produce diuersi fructi con coloriti fior et herba.

Laudato si, mi Signore, per quelli ke perdonano per lo Tuo amore
et sostengono infirmitate et tribulatione.

Beati quelli ke 'l sosterranno in pace,
ka da Te, Altissimo, sirano incoronati.

Laudato si mi Signore, per sora nostra Morte corporale,
da la quale nullu homo uiuente pò skappare:
guai a quelli ke morrano ne le peccata mortali;
beati quelli ke trouarà ne le Tue sanctissime uoluntati,
ka la morte secunda no 'l farrà male.

Laudate et benedicete mi Signore et rengratiate
e seruiteli cum grande humilitate.

Notes: so=sono, si=sii (be!), mi=mio, ka=perché, u and v are both written as u, sirano=saranno

English Translation:
Most High, all powerful, good Lord, 
Yours are the praises, the glory, the honour, and all blessing.

To You alone, Most High, do they belong, 
and no man is worthy to mention Your name.

Be praised, my Lord, through all your creatures, 
especially through my lord Brother Sun, 
who brings the day; and you give light through him. 
And he is beautiful and radiant in all his splendour! 
Of you, Most High, he bears the likeness.

Praised be You, my Lord, through Sister Moon and the stars, 
in heaven you formed them clear and precious and beautiful.

Praised be You, my Lord, through Brother Wind, 
and through the air, cloudy and serene, 
and every kind of weather through which you give sustenance to Your creatures.

Praised be You, my Lord, through Sister Water,
which is very useful and humble and precious and chaste.

Praised be You, my Lord, through Brother Fire, 
through whom you light the night and he is beautiful 
and playful and robust and strong.

Praised be You, my Lord, through Sister Mother Earth, 
who sustains us and governs us and who produces 
varied fruits with coloured flowers and herbs.

Praised be You, my Lord, through those who give pardon for Your love, 
and bear infirmity and tribulation.

Blessed are those who endure in peace 
for by You, Most High, they shall be crowned.

Praised be You, my Lord, through our Sister Bodily Death, 
from whom no living man can escape.
Woe to those who die in mortal sin. 
Blessed are those who will find Your most holy will, 
for the second death shall do them no harm.

Praise and bless my Lord, and give Him thanks 
and serve Him with great humility.

Alternative versions

Perhaps the best-known version in English is the hymn "All Creatures of Our God and King", which contains a paraphrase of Saint Francis' song by William H. Draper (1855–1933). Draper set the words to the 17th-century German hymn tune "Lasst uns erfreuen", for use at a children's choir festival sometime between 1899 and 1919.

Franz Liszt (1811–1886) composed several pieces titled "Cantico del sol di Francesco d'Assisi", with versions for solo piano, organ, and orchestra, composed or arranged between 1862 and 1882.

Hermann Suter composed an oratorio Le Laudi on the Italian words, premiered in 1924.

The American composer Amy Beach (1867–1944) set the Canticle to music for organ or orchestra, choir, and solo vocal quartet, in 1924. The piece was first performed with organ in 1928 at St. Bartholomew's in New York. The orchestral version was first performed by the Chicago Symphony and the Toledo Choral Society in 1930.

Nobilissima Visione (1938), a ballet by Paul Hindemith about Francis, references the Canticle in the final section.

Leo Sowerby (1895–1968) set Matthew Arnold's English translation of the Canticle for chorus and orchestra in 1945 (The Canticle of the Sun); the work was awarded the Pulitzer Prize for Music the following year.

Charles Martin Loeffler (1861–1935) set a modern Italian translation of the original Umbrian dialect text for soloists and chamber orchestra ca. 1929 which was performed in the same 1945 Carnegie Hall concert as Sowerby's setting.

Laudes Creaturarum was also set to music, in 1954, by German composer Carl Orff.

American poet Robert Lax titled his 1959 poem "The Circus of the Sun" in tribute to The Canticle.

Roy Harris (1898–1979) composed a setting for soloists and a large ensemble in 1961.

In the 1961 film, Francis of Assisi, the actor playing Brother Leo begins to sing the canticle but is overwhelmed by tears. Francis (Bradford Dillman) continues proclaiming, not singing, the rest.

Seth Bingham (1882–1972) made a setting in 1962.

San Francisco organist-composer Richard Purvis, who presided at Grace Cathedral, wrote a St. Francis Suite in 1964  which featured Canticle of the Sun as its concluding movement.

Version by Michael Garrett for four voices, part of performance by Lindsay Kemp, Purcell Room 1969

A modern rendition, composed by pop singer/composer Donovan, was used in the 1972 musical biography of Saint Francis, Brother Sun, Sister Moon.

Another setting of the Canticle of the Sun, titled Cantico del sole was composed by William Walton (1902–1983) in 1974 for the Cork International Choral Festival.

American composer Marty Haugen wrote a setting in 1980, published by GIA Publications entitled "Canticle of the Sun."

Swedish composer Fredrik Sixten composed a setting for 2 soprano soloists and organ, premiered at Princeton University Chapel 2010, commissioned by Dr James D Hicks 

The acclaimed Spanish composer Joaquín Rodrigo composed a piece to the words in Spanish of the Canticle, for choir and orchestra in 1982: Cantico de San Francisco de Asis.

Russian composer Sofia Gubaidulina wrote a piece dedicated to cellist Mstislav Rostropovich in 1997 for his 70th birthday.

The Italian folk singer Angelo Branduardi composed a ballad entitled "Il cantico delle creature" in year 2000 based on the original lyrics of the Canticle.

The lines "Brother Sun" and "Sister Moon" inspired the 2006 album Brother, Sister by indie rock band mewithoutYou.

The song "Brother Moon" by Gungor on their 2011 album Ghosts Upon the Earth was inspired by the Canticle.

Estonian composer Tõnu Kõrvits (b. 1969) composed a 12-part A cappella piece for mixed choir (SSAATTBB) "The Canticle of the Sun" for Southern Chorale choir in 2014.

Italian pop singer Jovanotti performed the song as part of a special concert in Assisi in 2014.  It was simply him and another guitarist performing "unplugged" style.

Pope Francis published his second encyclical Laudato si' on June 18, 2015. The Canticle inspired the encyclical's title, "Praise be to you," and was quoted in the first paragraph, "Praise be to you, Our Lord, through our Sister, Mother Earth, who sustains and governs us, and who produces various fruits, with colored flowers and herbs."

The Irish composer Vincent Kennedy was commissioned by the Irish Franciscans to set the Canticle of the Sun for Soprano, Harp and Trumpet. The resulting work has 9 songs containing the complete text of the Canticle. The first performance took place in the Franciscan church of Adam and Eve in Dublin on 4 June 2017.

Elizabeth Goudge, English novelist, included a version of the canticle in her short story about a Franciscan monk, Our Brother the Sun, published in January 1946: later, in her 1946 children's novel The Little White Horse, she provides Spring Song, a hymn written as a verse paraphrase, supposedly by the character, Old Parson: Chapter 9, Part 3.

See also
Benedicite
Great Hymn to the Aten
Saints and animal/plant life

References

External links
https://soundcloud.com/user-223114985/canticle-of-the-sun
Lyrics to the Canticle at Prayer Foundation.
Alternative Translation
Umbrian Version 1
Umbrian Version 2
101 Hymn Stories
Invitation to Italian Poetry

Francis of Assisi
Italian Christian hymns
13th-century poems
Franciscan spirituality
Umbria
1220s works
Christianity and nature
13th-century Christian texts